Cervalces is an extinct deer genus that lived during the Pliocene and Pleistocene epochs. Cervalces gallicus is either classified as a species of the related Libralces, or an ancestral species to other members of Cervalces. It lived in Europe from the Pliocene to the Pleistocene. Cervalces scotti, the stag-moose, lived in Pleistocene North America. Cervalces latifrons, the broad-fronted moose, and Cervalces carnutorum were found in Pleistocene Europe and Asia.

References

External links
Stag Moose Image Gallery

 
Alceini
Prehistoric deer
Pliocene even-toed ungulates
Pleistocene even-toed ungulates
Pleistocene mammals of North America
Pliocene first appearances
Pleistocene genus extinctions
Cenozoic mammals of North America
Cenozoic mammals of Europe
Cenozoic mammals of Asia
Prehistoric even-toed ungulate genera
Fossil taxa described in 1885